This is a list of games for Sony's PlayStation Portable (PSP) handheld game console made available to download from the PlayStation Store on PSP and PlayStation 3 (PS3), and in some cases on PlayStation Vita (PSV) and PlayStation TV (PSTV). While all have been playable on PSP, none have been playable on PS3, and PSV and PSTV support has varied among titles. This list does not include other titles made downloadable on PSP, namely PlayStation Minis or PSOne Classics. It also does not include PSP titles made available for download on PlayStation 4 and PlayStation 5.

PSP games
List of the 807 PSP games available to download from the PlayStation Store on contemporary hardware. Almost all first-party PSP games released after October 1, 2009, were available for download.

References

Portable downloadable games